Bryobeckettia is a genus of mosses belonging to the family Funariaceae.

The species of this genus are found in New Zealand.

Species 
 Bryobeckettia bartlettii Fife, 1985

References

Funariales
Moss genera